Gazik or Gezik may refer to:
 Gezik, Razavi Khorasan Province
 Gazik, Birjand, South Khorasan Province
 Gazik, Darmian, South Khorasan Province
 Gazik District, in South Khorasan Province
 Gazik Rural District, in South Khorasan Province